Cedric's Barber Battle is an American reality television series that aired on The CW. The show premiered on April 17, 2015. It is a barber competition series hosted by Cedric the Entertainer. The first season consists of 10 episodes, however, only 8 aired.

On August 23, 2016, The CW cancelled Cedric's Barber Battle after one season.

Episodes

References 

2010s American reality television series
2015 American television series debuts
English-language television shows
The CW original programming
2015 American television series endings